Joachim Karliczek (31 October 1914 – 17 April 1993) was a Polish swimmer. He competed in the men's 4 × 200 metre freestyle relay at the 1936 Summer Olympics.

References

External links
 

1914 births
1993 deaths
Polish male freestyle swimmers
Olympic swimmers of Poland
Swimmers at the 1936 Summer Olympics
Sportspeople from Katowice
20th-century Polish people